Dolle Dinsdag (Dutch: Mad Tuesday) took place in the Netherlands on 5 September 1944, when celebrations were prompted after broadcasts alleged that Breda, in occupied Netherlands, had been liberated by Allied forces.

Events 
On 4 September 1944 the Allies conquered Antwerp, and it was thought that they already advanced into the Netherlands. Radio Oranje broadcasts, one by the Prime Minister-in-exile Pieter Sjoerds Gerbrandy, increased the confusion; twice, in just over twelve hours (at 23.45 on 4 September and again in the morning of the 5th), they announced that Breda, 8 kilometers from the border with Holland, had been liberated (though in fact this success would not be achieved until 29 October 1944 by forces of 1st Polish Armoured Division of General Maczek). The news spread rapidly, with underground newspapers preparing headlines announcing the "fall of Breda". 

Further fueling speculation, German occupation officials Arthur Seyss-Inquart (appointed Reichskommissar for the Occupied Netherlands in May 1940) and Hanns Albin Rauter, SS and police leader announced a "State of Siege" for the Netherlands to the 300,000 cable radio listeners and in the newspapers of the following day:The population must maintain order ... it is strictly forbidden to flee areas that are threatened by the enemy. All orders from the military commanders must be strictly adhered to and without question ... any resistance to the occupation forces will be suppressed with force of weaponry. Any attempt to fraternize with the enemy or to hinder the German Reich and its allies in any form will be dealt with harshly; perpetrators will be shot.'

Despite the threats, many Dutchmen celebrated on the streets while preparing to receive and cheer on the Allied liberators. Dutch and Orange flags and pennants were prepared, and many workers left their workplace to wait for the Allies to arrive. The extent of this optimism as measure of Dutch attitudes to Occupation has been hard for historians to gauge in the absence of any contemporary surveys, but it can be discerned as significant by researchers accessing diaries and finding an increase in births in statistics nine months after Dolle Dinsdag. German occupation forces and NSB members panicked: documents were destroyed and many fled the Netherlands for Germany. Ary Willem Gijsbert Koppejan (1919—2013), a member of the resistance organisation De Ondergedoken Camera (the Underground Camera), secretly photographed German troops fleeing the city and soldiers and collaborators waiting at the Den Haag railway station on Dolle Dinsdag.

Effects 
The Allied advance could not continue as the Allies had overextended themselves and had to halt in the South of the Netherlands and Operation Market Garden in September was an outright failure since the planned Allied advance across the Rhine had to be abandoned. The occupiers' nervousness turned to aggression after the landings in Normandy in June 1944 and increased after Dolle Dinsdag. Due to this defeat, the liberation of the remaining Dutch territory was postponed until the next spring, and the northern part of the Netherlands had to wait until 5 May 1945 for their liberation. This last, terrible winter under occupation became known as the “Hunger Winter, killing approximately 25,000 victims, mostly elderly men, though the toll from its related health effects is likely higher.”

Mad Tuesday caused the railway strikes of 1944 that started on 17 September with the code: "De kinderen van Versteeg moeten onder de wol" (translation: the children of Versteeg must "get under the wool"/go to bed). The strike would last until the complete Netherlands was liberated on 5 May 1945; the government-in-exile thought that by spreading rumors the Germans would start to panic. It worked, and by announcing the railway strike of 1944 the Germans started to panic even more, and many Germans and Dutch collaborators fled to Germany, fearing reprisals (Seyss-Inquart had already set the example; on September 3, he had sent his wife to Salzburg). The industry and supply route from and to Germany was almost completely stopped, which made it even harder for Germany to defend what still was occupied.

Origin of the term 
The originator of the phrase "Dolle Dinsdag" is presumed to be Willem van den Hout, alias Willem W. Waterman who first used it in a headline in the September 15 issue of his magazine De Gil ('The Yell', with 200,000 subscribers), though it had likely emerged in general usage before that. De Gil satirised the NSB, the German occupiers, and the Dutch government-in-exile, but was actually funded by the Hauptabteilung für Volksaufklärung und Propaganda, the German propaganda department.

References

Military history of the Netherlands during World War II
1944 in the Netherlands